The Lizzie McGuire literary franchise is a series of books and comics based on the eponymous television show, which aired from 2001 to 2004, and its theatrical movie. The core franchise consists of 21 junior novels that were published between May 2002 and December 2005, seven Lizzie McGuire Mysteries novels that were published between May 2004 and May 2006 and two Lizzie McGuire Super Special novels that were published in May 2005 and May 2006. 15 Cine-Manga comics were published between May 2003 and May 2006, as well as four crafting books and 11 other books, including two survival guides and an episode guide. Six boxed sets that compile a number of junior novels from the franchise have also been released, as well as three audiobooks. With the exception of the Cine-Magna series, which was published by Tokyopop, all of the books in the Lizzie McGuire franchise were published by Disney Press.

Books

Junior novels

Mysteries

Crafting books

Super specials

Other books

Comics

Box sets

Audiobooks

Notes

References

Books
Lists of novels based on works
Disney-related lists
Novels based on television series